Bozo is the debut studio album of the singer/songwriter Lida Husik, released in 1991 by Shimmy Disc.

Critical reception
Option wrote that the "instrumentation and production here are the stuff of which demos are made, and the promising, disparate numbers ... end up sounding sadly uniform."

Track listing

Personnel 
Adapted from Bozo liner notes.

 Lida Husik – lead vocals, instruments, production (7–11)
Musicians
 Brett Ackerman – guitar (5)
 Reverend Chester Hawkins – additional vocals (11)
 Melaney Holman – guitar and bass guitar (7)
 David Licht – drums (3–5)

Production and additional personnel
 Guy Dove – photography
 Kramer – production and engineering (1–6, 12), slide guitar (2)
 Michael Macioce – photography
 Don Zientara – engineering (3–5)

Release history

References

External links 
 

1991 debut albums
Lida Husik albums
Albums produced by Kramer (musician)
Shimmy Disc albums